Trident is an unincorporated community in Township 13, Benton County, Arkansas, United States. It is located on Long Farm Road just off Arkansas Highway 244.

References

Unincorporated communities in Benton County, Arkansas
Unincorporated communities in Arkansas